Meghli, moghli, meghleh,, or karawiyah, is a Levantine dessert based on a floured rice pudding and spiced with anise, caraway, and cinnamon. The dish is often garnished with dried coconut flakes and various nuts including almonds, walnuts, pine nuts, and pistachios. Meghli is commonly served to celebrate the birth of a child.

Name
The name 'meghli' means “boiled” in Arabic, referring to the long time (up to an hour) it must be continuously stirred while boiling.

Celebrations
The dish was traditionally served to celebrate the birth of a male heir, but has now become a dessert to celebrate any newborn. The caraway is thought to assist the new mother in lactating and reduces bloating.

Meghli is also served during the Christmas holiday in recognition of the birth of Christ. Meghli is also symbolic of fertile soil , which is brown like the Meghli.

In Lebanon, it is often served cold. In Syria and Jordan, it is commonly called karawiya (the Arabic name for caraway) and more commonly served warm.

See also
Ashure

References

Arab cuisine
Levantine cuisine
Rice pudding